Hinkle Creek is a creek in Folsom, California. It is a tributary of the American River.

References

American River (California)